The AeroAndina MXP-150 Kimbaya is a Colombian light-sport aircraft that was designed and produced by AeroAndina of Cali.

The MXP-150 is no longer in production.

Design and development
The aircraft was designed to comply with the US light-sport aircraft rules, although it was never certified in that category. It features a strut-braced high-wing, a two-seats-in-side-by-side configuration enclosed cockpit, tricycle landing gear and a single engine in tractor configuration.

The aircraft is made from aluminum sheet. Its  span wing is supported by V-struts and jury struts. Standard engines available were the  Rotax 912ULS four-stroke and a  Continental Motors, Inc. four-stroke powerplant.

Specifications (MXP-150 Kimbaya)

References

Light-sport aircraft
Single-engined tractor aircraft